Edward Parker Deacon (October 2, 1844 – July 5, 1901) was an American heir known for killing his wife's lover in her apartments at Cannes, France.

Early life
Deacon was born in Paris on October 2, 1844, the "descendant of an old and once distinguished family" from Boston. His parents were Edward Preble Deacon (1813–1851) and Sarah Annabella ( Parker) Deacon (1821–1900). He had a brother named Austin Deacon. His father had served as an attaché of the U.S. Legation in Paris under General Lewis Cass.

His paternal grandparents were Commodore David Deacon and Anna Hutchinson Deacon. His maternal grandparents were Peter Parker and Elizabeth Allston ( Read) Parker. His maternal aunt, Ellen Parker, was the wife of Albert Gallatin Van Zandt, and his uncle, Harleston Parker, married Adeline Ellen Reynolds and was the father of architect J. Harleston Parker.

Personal life
On April 29, 1879, he married Florence Baldwin (1859–1919) in New York City. Florence, who spent much of her life in Rome, was the daughter of Rear Admiral Charles Henry Baldwin and Pamelia Caroline ( Tolfree) Baldwin. Before their eventual divorce, they were the parents of four girls and one boy who died in infancy, including:

 Gladys Marie Deacon (1881–1977), who married Charles Spencer-Churchill, 9th Duke of Marlborough in 1921 after his divorce from Consuelo Vanderbilt.
 Ida Audrey Deacon (1884–1904), who died unmarried at age 19 of heart disease.
 Edith Florence Deacon (1887–1965), who was engaged to George Lee Peabody but he died before they married; she later married Henry Gunther Gray, son of John Clinton Gray, in 1919.
 Dorothy Evelyn Deacon (1891–1960), who married Prince Albert Radziwiłł, a grandson of Prince Antoni Wilhelm Radziwiłł, in 1910. They divorced and she married Count Paul Pálffy ab Erdöd; they also divorced.

In 1899, he was "sent to the McLean Hospital for the Insane. He was at Newport when his derangement was first noticed and was expelled from a reading room there because he persisted in taking ice from a water pitcher to cool his head." Deacon died at McLean Hospital in Belmont, Massachusetts on July 5, 1901. After a funeral at Trinity Church, Newport, he was interred at Island Cemetery. Shortly before his own death, he "came into possession, through the death of his mother, of a large trust fund." His estate was left in four equal shares to his children with William P. Blake of Boston as executor.

Murder and imprisonment
On February 19, 1892, Deacon discovered Emile Abeille, his wife's lover, in his wife's apartments at the Hôtel Splendide at Cannes. After breaking down the door to the apartment, Abeille hid behind a chair and Deacon shot several times, killing the man. Deacon, who surrendered to the police immediately after the shooting, had "the sympathy of the entire American colony," and was released on 10,000 francs bail. When Edward surrendered himself to the court, Florence left France "in order to avoid the possibility of being subpoeaned as a witness at the trial." "In court at Nice a verdict of manslaughter was handed in and Mr. Deacon was sentenced to one year's imprisonment."

Deacon was "confined in the prison adjacent to the Palace of Justice" in Nice, France, where he was "entertained like a guest," After he was released from prison, he was pardoned by President Sadi Carnot, Edward and Florence were divorced in 1893, and Edward was awarded custody of the three older children. He took them to the United States, where he remained for the next three years. Deacon became mentally unstable and was hospitalised at McLean Hospital, where he died in 1901. Deacon and her sisters returned to France to live with their mother.

References
Notes

Sources

1844 births
1901 deaths
American people convicted of manslaughter